West Coast cricket team was a cricket team nominally representing the West Coast of the North Island of New Zealand, but actually from Wanganui.

West Coast appeared twice in recorded cricket.  The first match was a first-class match against Wellington in 1879 at the Basin Reserve. Captained by George Anson, the team won its only appearance in first-class cricket by 6 wickets. In the low-scoring match, William Barton scored 75 not out in West Coast's first innings; the next-highest score in the match was 26.  The team's second appearance came in a one-day match against Wellington in 1882. The New Zealand captain and cricket historian Dan Reese later wrote: "For a couple of years ... Wanganui cricket reached first-class standard, chiefly on account of Barton, then the best batsman in New Zealand, being resident there. But neither before nor since have they been first-class."

A West Coast Cricket Association was formed in 1888, based in Wanganui and including Hawera and Feilding. It lapsed in the 1890s, and never fielded a representative team. It should not be confused with the South Island's West Coast Cricket Association, formed around the same time, based in Greymouth, which is still in existence.

References

External links
West Coast (North Island) at CricketArchive

Cricket teams in New Zealand
Former senior cricket clubs in New Zealand